Harry Harley (6 February 1916 – 11 October 1994) was a former Australian rules footballer who played with Melbourne in the Victorian Football League (VFL).

Notes

External links 

1916 births
Australian rules footballers from Victoria (Australia)
Melbourne Football Club players
1994 deaths